The Terrafugia Transition is a light sport, roadable airplane under development by Terrafugia since 2006.

Equipment includes a Dynon Skyview glass panel avionics system, an airframe parachute, and an optional autopilot.

When operated as a car, the engine power take-off near the propeller engages a variable-diameter pulley CVT automatic transmission to send power to the trailing-suspension mounted rear wheels via half-shafts powering belt drives. In flight, the engine drives a pusher propeller. The Transition has folding wings and a twin tail.

Design and development
The experimental Transition Proof of Concept's first flight in March 2009 was successful and took place at Plattsburgh International Airport in upstate New York using U.S. Federal Aviation Administration (FAA) tail number N302TF. First customer delivery, as of March 2009, was originally planned to take approximately 18 months and occur in 2011.

The extra  granted by the exemption provides more weight allowance for the mandatory road safety features such as airbags and bumpers.

The proposed design of the production version was made by Danish designer Jens Martin Skibsted and his partners at KiBiSi and made public at AirVenture Oshkosh on July 26, 2010.  Aerodynamic changes revealed included a new, optimized airfoil, Hoerner wingtips, and removal of the canard after it was found to have an adverse aerodynamic interaction with the front wheel suspension struts; furthermore, the multipurpose passenger vehicle classification from the NHTSA removed the requirement for a full width bumper that had inspired the original canard design.

On November 16, 2010, the U.S. National Highway Traffic Safety Administration (NHTSA) published Terrafugia's petition for a temporary, three-year hardship exemption from four FMVSS standards in the Transition. Terrafugia requested to use lighter weight motorcycle tires instead of RV tires, polycarbonate for the windshield and side windows, basic airbags instead of advanced, dual stage airbags and to not include an electronic stability control system. 
The NHTSA granted all of the requested exemptions on June 29, 2011, but limited the stability control and airbag exemptions to one year.

In June 2011, a delay was announced and Terrafugia's CEO estimated that about another 18 months would be required before first customer delivery in "late 2012", but this was not achieved. December 2011 saw the base price increase to US$279,000 from an initial price of US$194,000.

After undergoing drive tests and high-speed taxi tests, the production prototype completed its first flight on March 23, 2012, at the same airport in Plattsburgh, New York, that was used for the Proof of Concept's flight testing. The production prototype then made its auto show debut at the 2012 New York International Auto Show in April 2012.

In June 2012, Terrafugia announced that the Transition had completed the first of six phases of flight testing.  By July, the second phase of testing was underway, expanding the performance envelope in the sky and continuing drive testing on the ground.

In January 2013, development continued and the company announced that it might be necessary to construct a third, completely new prototype, due to the large number of modifications required. The modifications to date are said to appear to have improved the previous handling characteristics.

By March 2014, the design of the third, updated prototype had progressed to finalization of the major structural members and a statement to investors said that it would be used in final compliance testing for certification before the first customer delivery which was then estimated to take at least another 18 months and occur "in 2015".

By April 2014, 12 two-person test flights had taken place; this was the first time that anyone other than Terrafugia's chief test pilot had flown the Transition.  , first customer delivery was hoped for in about 18 months "in the second quarter of 2016."

The company indicated that the increases were required to allow inclusion of structures to meet FMVSS ground operation safety regulations. During consultations the request for the weight increase was supported by the General Aviation Manufacturers Association, the Experimental Aircraft Association, the Aircraft Owners and Pilots Association and the Light Aircraft Manufacturers Association. Only a few individuals expressed opposition to the request. The exemption was granted by the FAA on 19 June 2016.

In April 2015 the company announced that parts were being built for the third version of the aircraft, and that current planning estimated the first customer delivery after roughly two years.  Terrafugia COO/VP of Engineering Kevin Colburn also stated that the company has changed the price estimate from $279K to between $300K and $400K.

In November 2015, the company announced that the third version of the Transition was being tested with a Rotax 912is engine, rather than the Rotax 912ULS that the second prototype had flown with.

As of April 2017, the company's website says: "Today, Terrafugia is finalizing production vehicle design and compliance testing in preparation for vehicle deliveries within the next three years."

As of November 2017, media reports suggested a 2019 delivery date for the first vehicles.

In April 2018, the production prototype ("D2") was retired. While the original proof of concept vehicle had flown only about 8 hours in total, the production prototype had logged 212 flight hours, completing 317 takeoffs and landings.

In July 2018 the company announced a series of upgrades that will be incorporated in the production aircraft with delivery planned for July 2019. These include a hybrid-electric motor and lithium iron phosphate battery for road mode use, a Dynon electronic flight instrument system, a Ballistic Recovery Systems ballistic parachute, an inflight power boost feature, a remodeled interior, increased cargo space, improved seat belt design, airbags, plus three rearview cameras.

In January 2021, Terrafugia announced that the Transition received a Special Light-Sport Aircraft (LSA) airworthiness certificate from the FAA for the Transition to be flown only, with road use approval to follow in 2022.

In February 2021, it was reported that Terrafugia had laid off most of their employees and would close down operations in the United States later in the year, with the intention of moving to China.

Specifications

 Dynon Avionics EMS-D120 Engine Monitoring System
 Garmin GTX 327 Transponder
 Garmin SL30  nav/comm transceiver

The Production Prototype has a glass cockpit including:

 Dynon Avionics SkyView SV-D1000
 XCOM Avionics VHF Transceiver
 Transition custom touch screen dashboard computer

References

External links

 
Terrafugia Transition - First Flight Video Press Release on March 18, 2009, in Plattsburgh, NY. - (YouTube)
 Anna Mracek Dietrich: A plane you can drive - presentation at TEDGlobal, July 2011

Roadable aircraft
2000s United States sport aircraft
Light-sport aircraft
Aircraft first flown in 2009
Single-engined pusher aircraft
Urban air mobility